Sunday of Life (German: Sonntag des Lebens) is a 1931 American drama film directed by Leo Mittler and starring Camilla Horn, Willy Clever and Oscar Marion. It was made at the Joinville Studios in Paris by Paramount Pictures as the German-language version of The Devil's Holiday.

Cast
 Camilla Horn as Ellen Hobart  
 Willy Clever as David Stone  
 Oskar Marion as Mark Stone  
 Leopold von Ledebur as Ezra Stone 
 Werner Kepich as Charlie Thorn  
 Otto Kronburger as Dr. Reynolds 
 Peter Ihle as Monk Mac Connell  
 Emmerich Lukas as Jack Carr  
 Ernestine Mayer as Tante Betty 
 Eugen Rex as Hamond  
 Margarete Roma as Ethel

References

Bibliography
 Alan Gevinson. Within Our Gates: Ethnicity in American Feature Films, 1911-1960. University of California Press, 1997.

External links
 

1931 films
American drama films
1931 drama films
1930s German-language films
Films directed by Leo Mittler
Paramount Pictures films
Films shot in France
Films shot at Joinville Studios
American multilingual films
American black-and-white films
1931 multilingual films
1930s American films